América Futebol Clube, commonly known as América or as América-PE, is a Brazilian football club based in Recife, Pernambuco state. They won the Campeonato Pernambucano six times.

History
The club was founded on April 12, 1914. They won the Campeonato Pernambucano in 1918, 1919, 1921, 1922, 1927, and in 1944.

Stadium
América Futebol Clube play their home games at Estádio Ademir Cunha, nicknamed Cunhão. The stadium has a maximum capacity of 12,000 people.

Achievements

 Campeonato Pernambucano:
 Winners (6): 1918, 1919, 1921, 1922, 1927, 1944

References

External links
 Official website

Football clubs in Pernambuco
Association football clubs established in 1914
1914 establishments in Brazil
América Futebol Clube (PE)